Nāgārjuna [c. 150 – c. 250 CE (disputed)] was an Indian Mahāyāna Buddhist thinker, scholar-saint and philosopher. He is widely considered one of the most important Buddhist philosophers. Jan Westerhoff considers him to be "one of the greatest thinkers in the history of Asian philosophy."

Nāgārjuna is widely considered to be the founder of the Madhyamaka (centrism, middle-way) school of Buddhist philosophy and a defender of the Mahāyāna movement. His Mūlamadhyamakakārikā (Root Verses on Madhyamaka, or MMK) is the most important text on the madhyamaka philosophy of emptiness. The MMK inspired a large number of commentaries in Sanskrit, Chinese, Tibetan, Korean and Japanese and continues to be studied today.

History

Background 
India in the first and second centuries CE was politically divided into various states, including the Kushan Empire and the Satavahana Kingdom. At this point in Buddhist history, the Buddhist community was already divided into various Buddhist schools and had spread throughout India.

At this time, there was already a small and nascent Mahāyāna movement. Mahāyāna ideas were held by a minority of Buddhists in India at the time. As Joseph Walser writes, "Mahāyāna before the fifth century was largely invisible and probably existed only as a minority and largely unrecognized movement within the fold of nikāya Buddhism." By the second century, early Mahāyāna Sūtras such as the Aṣṭasāhasrikā Prajñāpāramitā were already circulating among certain Mahāyāna circles.

Life 
Very little is reliably known of the life of Nāgārjuna and modern historians do not agree on a specific date (1st to 3rd century CE) or place (multiple places in India suggested) for him. The earliest surviving accounts were written in Chinese and Tibetan centuries after his death and are mostly hagiographical accounts that are historically unverifiable.

Some scholars such as Joseph Walser argue that Nāgārjuna was an advisor to a king of the Sātavāhana dynasty which ruled the Deccan Plateau in the second century. This is supported by most of the traditional hagiographical sources as well. Archaeological evidence at Amarāvatī indicates that if this is true, the king may have been Yajña Śrī Śātakarṇi (c. second half of the 2nd century). On the basis of this association, Nāgārjuna is conventionally placed at around 150–250 CE.

Walser thinks that it is most likely that when Nāgārjuna wrote the Ratnavali, he lived in a mixed monastery (with Mahāyānists and non-Mahāyānists) in which Mahāyānists were the minority. The most likely sectarian affiliation of the monastery according to Walser was Purvasailya,  Aparasailya, or Caityaka (which were Mahāsāṃghika sub-schools).

He also argues that "it is plausible that he wrote the Ratnavali within a thirty-year period at the end of the second century in the Andhra region around Dhanyakataka (modern-day Amaravati)."

Traditional hagiography 
According to Walser, "the earliest extant legends about Nāgārjuna are compiled into Kumārajīva’s biography of Nāgārjuna, which he translated into Chinese in about 405 CE." According to this biography, Nāgārjuna was born into a Brahmin family and later became a Buddhist. The traditional religious hagiographies place Nāgārjuna in various regions of India (Kumārajīva and Candrakirti place him in Vidarbha region of South India, Xuanzang in south Kosala)

Traditional religious hagiographies credit Nāgārjuna with being associated with the teaching of the Prajñāpāramitā sūtras as well as with having revealed these scriptures to the world after they had remained hidden for some time. The sources differ on where this happened and how Nāgārjuna retrieved the sutras. Some sources say he retrieved the sutras from the land of the nāgas.  

Indeed, Nāgārjuna is often depicted in composite form comprising human and nāga characteristics. Nāgas are snake-like supernatural beings of great magical power that feature in Hindu, Buddhist and Jain mythology. Nāgas are found throughout Indian religious culture, and typically signify intelligent serpents or dragons that are responsible for rain, lakes, and other bodies of water. In Buddhism, a naga can be a symbol of a realised arhat or wise person.

Traditional sources also claim that Nāgārjuna practiced ayurvedic alchemy (rasayāna). Kumārajīva's biography for example, has Nāgārjuna making an elixir of invisibility, and Bus-ton, Taranatha and Xuanzang all state that he could turn rocks into gold.

Tibetan hagiographies also state that Nāgārjuna studied at Nālanda University. However, according to Walser, this university was not a strong monastic center until about 425. Also, as Walser notes, "Xuanzang and Yijing both spent considerable time at Nālanda and studied Nāgārjuna’s texts there. It is strange that they would have spent so much time there and yet chose not to report any local tales of a man whose works played such an important part in the curriculum."

Some sources (Bu-ston and the other Tibetan historians) claim that in his later years, Nāgārjuna lived on the mountain of Śrīparvata near the city that would later be called Nāgārjunakoṇḍa ("Hill of Nāgārjuna"). The ruins of Nāgārjunakoṇḍa are located in Guntur district, Andhra Pradesh. The Caitika and Bahuśrutīya nikāyas are known to have had monasteries in Nāgārjunakoṇḍa. The archaeological finds at Nāgārjunakoṇḍa have not resulted in any evidence that the site was associated with Nagarjuna. The name "Nāgārjunakoṇḍa" dates from the medieval period, and the 3rd-4th century inscriptions found at the site make it clear that it was known as "Vijayapuri" in the ancient period.

Other Nāgārjunas 
There are a multitude of texts attributed to "Nāgārjuna", many of these texts date from much later periods. This has caused much confusion for the traditional Buddhist biographers and doxographers. Modern scholars are divided on how to classify these later texts and how many later writers called "Nāgārjuna" existed (the name remains still popular today in Andhra Pradesh).

Some scholars have posited that there was a separate Aryuvedic writer called Nāgārjuna who wrote numerous treatises on Rasayana. Also, there is a later Tantric Buddhist author by the same name who may have been a scholar at Nālandā University and wrote on Buddhist tantra . According to Donald S. Lopez Jr., he originally belonged to a Brahmin family from eastern India and later became Buddhist.

There is also a Jain figure of the same name who was said to have traveled to the Himalayas. Walser thinks that it is possible that stories related to this figure influenced Buddhist legends as well.

Works

There exist a number of influential texts attributed to Nāgārjuna; however, as there are many pseudepigrapha attributed to him, lively controversy exists over which are his authentic works.

Mūlamadhyamakakārikā

The Mūlamadhyamakakārikā is Nāgārjuna's best-known work. It is "not only a grand commentary on the Buddha's discourse to Kaccayana, the only discourse cited by name, but also a detailed and careful analysis of most of the important discourses included in the Nikayas and the Agamas, especially those of the Atthakavagga of the Sutta-nipata.

In the Mūlamadhyamakakārikā, "[A]ll experienced phenomena are empty (sunya). This did not mean that they are not experienced and, therefore, non-existent; only that they are devoid of a permanent and eternal substance (svabhava) because, like a dream, they are mere projections of human consciousness. Since these imaginary fictions are experienced, they are not mere names (prajnapti)."

Major attributed works
According to David Seyfort Ruegg, the Madhyamakasastrastuti attributed to Candrakirti (c. 600 – c. 650) refers to eight texts by Nagarjuna:the (Madhyamaka)karikas, the Yuktisastika, the Sunyatasaptati, the Vigrahavyavartani, the Vidala (i.e. Vaidalyasutra/Vaidalyaprakarana), the Ratnavali, the Sutrasamuccaya, and Samstutis (Hymns). This list covers not only much less than the grand total of works ascribed to Nagarjuna in the Chinese and Tibetan collections, but it does not even include all such works that Candrakirti has himself cited in his writings.According to one view, that of Christian Lindtner, the works definitely written by Nāgārjuna are:

Mūlamadhyamaka-kārikā (Fundamental Verses of the Middle Way, MMK), available in three Sanskrit manuscripts and numerous translations.
Śūnyatāsaptati (Seventy Verses on Emptiness), accompanied by a prose commentary ascribed to Nagarjuna himself.
Vigrahavyāvartanī (The End of Disputes).
 (Pulverizing the Categories), a prose work critiquing the categories used by Indian Nyaya philosophy. 
Vyavahārasiddhi (Proof of Convention).
 (Sixty Verses on Reasoning).
 (Four Hymns):  Lokātīta-stava (Hymn to transcendence), Niraupamya-stava (to the Peerless), Acintya-stava (to the Inconceivable), and Paramārtha-stava (to Ultimate Truth).
Ratnāvalī (Precious Garland), subtitled (rajaparikatha), a discourse addressed to an Indian king (possibly a Satavahana monarch). 
 (Verses on the heart of Dependent Arising), along with a short commentary (Vyākhyāna).
Sūtrasamuccaya, an anthology of various sutra passages. 
 (Exposition of the awakening mind).
 (Letter to a Good Friend).
 (Requisites of awakening), a work the path of the Bodhisattva and paramitas, it is quoted by Candrakirti in his commentary on Aryadeva's four hundred. Now only extant in Chinese translation (Taisho 1660).

Other scholars have challenged and argued against some of the above works being Nagarjuna's. David F. Burton notes that Christian Lindtner is "rather liberal" with his list of works and that other scholars have called some of these into question. He notes how Paul Williams argued convincingly that the  must be a later text. In his study, Burton relies on the texts that he considers "least controversial": Mūlamadhyamaka-kārikā, Vigrahavyāvartanī, Śūnyatāsaptati,  and Ratnāvalī. 

Similarly, Jan Westerhoff notes how there is uncertainty about the attribution of Nagarjuna's works (and about his life in general). He relies on six works: MMK, Vigrahavyāvartanī, Śūnyatāsaptati,  and Ratnāvalī, all of which "expound a single, coherent philosophical system," and are attributed to Nagarjuna by a variety of Indian and Tibetan sources. 

The Tibetan historian Buston considers the first six to be the main treatises of Nāgārjuna (this is called the "yukti corpus", rigs chogs), while according to Tāranātha only the first five are the works of Nāgārjuna. TRV Murti considers Ratnāvalī, Pratītyasamutpādahṝdaya and Sūtrasamuccaya to be works of Nāgārjuna as the first two are quoted profusely by Chandrakirti and the third by Shantideva.

Other attributed works 
In addition to works mentioned above, numerous other works are attributed to Nāgārjuna, many of which are dubious attributions and later works. There is an ongoing, lively controversy over which of those works are authentic. Christian Lindtner divides the various attributed works as "1) correctly attributed, 2) wrongly attributed to him, and 3) those which may or may not be genuine."

Lindtner further divides the third category of dubious or questionable texts into those which are "perhaps authentic" and those who are unlikely to be authentic.

Those which he sees as perhaps being authentic include:

 Mahāyānavimsika, it is cited as Nagarjuna's work in the Tattvasamgraha as well as by Atisha, Lindtner sees the style and content as compatible with the yukti corpus. Survives in Sanskrit. 
 Bodhicittotpādavidhi,  a short text that describes the sevenfold write for a bodhisattva, 
 Dvadasakāranayastotra, a madhyamaka text only extant in Tibetan, 
 (Madhyamaka-)Bhavasamkrānti, a verse from this is attributed to Nagarjuna by Bhavaviveka. 
 Nirālamba-stava, 
 Sālistambakārikā, only exists in Tibetan, it is a versification of the Śālistamba Sūtra
 Stutytitastava,  only exists in Tibetan
 Danaparikatha,  only exists in Tibetan, a praise of giving (dana)
 Cittavajrastava, 
 Mulasarvāstivadisrāmanerakārikā, 50 karikas on the Vinaya of the Mulasarvastivadins
 Dasabhumikavibhāsā,  only exists in Chinese, a commentary on the Dashabhumikasutra 
 Lokapariksā, 
 Yogasataka,  a medical text
 Prajñadanda
 Rasavaisesikasutra, a rasayana (biochemical) text
 Bhāvanākrama, contains various verses similar to the Lankavatara, it is cited in the Tattvasamgraha as by Nagarjuna
Ruegg notes various works of uncertain authorship which have been attributed to Nagarjuna, including the Dharmadhatustava (Hymn to the Dharmadhatu, which shows later influences), Mahayanavimsika, Salistambakarikas, the Bhavasamkranti, and the Dasabhumtkavibhāsā. Furthermore, Ruegg writes that "three collections of stanzas on the virtues of intelligence and moral conduct ascribed to Nagarjuna are extant in Tibetan translation": Prajñasatakaprakarana, Nitisastra-Jantuposanabindu and Niti-sastra-Prajñadanda.

Attributions which are likely to be false 
Meanwhile, those texts that Lindtner considers as questionable and likely inauthentic are: Aksarasataka, Akutobhaya (Mulamadhyamakavrtti), Aryabhattaraka-Manjusriparamarthastuti, Kayatrayastotra, Narakoddharastava, Niruttarastava, Vandanastava, Dharmasamgraha, Dharmadhatugarbhavivarana, Ekaslokasastra, Isvarakartrtvanirakrtih (A refutation of God/Isvara), Sattvaradhanastava, Upayahrdaya, Astadasasunyatasastra, Dharmadhatustava, Yogaratnamala.Meanwhile, Lindtner's list of outright wrong attributions is: Mahāprajñāpāramitopadeśa (Dà zhìdù lùn), Abudhabodhakaprakarana, Guhyasamajatantratika, Dvadasadvaraka, Prajñaparamitastotra, and Svabhavatrayapravesasiddhi.Notably, the Dà zhìdù lùn (Taisho 1509, "Commentary on the great prajñaparamita") which has been influential in Chinese Buddhism, has been questioned as a genuine work of Nāgārjuna by various scholars including Lamotte. This work is also only attested in a Chinese translation by Kumārajīva and is unknown in the Tibetan and Indian traditions.

Other works are extant only in Chinese, one of these is the Shih-erh-men-lun or 'Twelve-topic treatise' (*Dvadasanikaya or *Dvadasamukha-sastra); one of the three basic treatises of the Sanlun school (East Asian Madhyamaka).

Several works considered important in esoteric Buddhism are attributed to Nāgārjuna and his disciples by traditional historians like Tāranātha from 17th century Tibet. These historians try to account for chronological difficulties with various theories, such as seeing later writings as mystical revelations. For a useful summary of this tradition, see Wedemeyer 2007. Lindtner sees the author of some of these tantric works as being a tantric Nagarjuna who lives much later, sometimes called "Nagarjuna II".

Philosophy

Sunyata

Nāgārjuna's major thematic focus is the concept of śūnyatā (translated into English as "emptiness") which brings together other key Buddhist doctrines, particularly anātman "not-self" and pratītyasamutpāda "dependent origination", to refute the metaphysics of some of his contemporaries. For Nāgārjuna, as for the Buddha in the early texts, it is not merely sentient beings that are "selfless" or non-substantial; all phenomena (dhammas) are without any svabhāva, literally "own-being", "self-nature", or "inherent existence" and thus without any underlying essence. They are empty of being independently existent; thus the heterodox theories of svabhāva circulating at the time were refuted on the basis of the doctrines of early Buddhism. This is so because all things arise always dependently: not by their own power, but by depending on conditions leading to their coming into existence, as opposed to being.

Nāgārjuna means by real any entity which has a nature of its own (svabhāva), which is not produced by causes (akrtaka), which is not dependent on anything else (paratra nirapeksha).

Chapter 24 verse 14 of the Mūlamadhyamakakārikā provides one of Nāgārjuna's most famous quotations on emptiness and co-arising:

As part of his analysis of the emptiness of phenomena in the Mūlamadhyamakakārikā, Nāgārjuna critiques svabhāva in several different concepts. He discusses the problems of positing any sort of inherent essence to causation, movement, change and personal identity. Nāgārjuna makes use of the Indian logical tool of the tetralemma to attack any essentialist conceptions. Nāgārjuna's logical analysis is based on four basic propositions:

All things (dharma) exist: affirmation of being, negation of non-being
All things (dharma) do not exist: affirmation of non-being, negation of being
All things (dharma) both exist and do not exist: both affirmation and negation
All things (dharma) neither exist nor do not exist: neither affirmation nor negation 

To say that all things are 'empty' is to deny any kind of ontological foundation; therefore Nāgārjuna's view is often seen as a kind of ontological anti-foundationalism or a metaphysical anti-realism.

Understanding the nature of the emptiness of phenomena is simply a means to an end, which is nirvana. Thus Nāgārjuna's philosophical project is ultimately a soteriological one meant to correct our everyday cognitive processes which mistakenly posits svabhāva on the flow of experience.

Some scholars such as Fyodor Shcherbatskoy and T.R.V. Murti held that Nāgārjuna was the inventor of the Shunyata doctrine; however, more recent work by scholars such as Choong Mun-keat, Yin Shun and Dhammajothi Thero has argued that Nāgārjuna was not an innovator by putting forth this theory, but that, in the words of Shi Huifeng, "the connection between emptiness and dependent origination is not an innovation or creation of Nāgārjuna".

Two truths

Nāgārjuna was also instrumental in the development of the two truths doctrine, which claims that there are two levels of truth in Buddhist teaching, the ultimate truth (paramārtha satya) and the conventional or superficial truth (saṃvṛtisatya). The ultimate truth to Nāgārjuna is the truth that everything is empty of essence, this includes emptiness itself ('the emptiness of emptiness'). While some (Murti, 1955) have interpreted this by positing Nāgārjuna as a neo-Kantian and thus making ultimate truth a metaphysical noumenon or an "ineffable ultimate that transcends the capacities of discursive reason", others such as Mark Siderits and Jay L. Garfield have argued that Nāgārjuna's view is that "the ultimate truth is that there is no ultimate truth" (Siderits) and that Nāgārjuna is a "semantic anti-dualist" who posits that there are only conventional truths. Hence according to Garfield:

Suppose that we take a conventional entity, such as a table. We analyze it to demonstrate its emptiness, finding that there is no table apart from its parts […]. So we conclude that it is empty. But now let us analyze that emptiness […]. What do we find? Nothing at all but the table’s lack of inherent existence. […]. To see the table as empty […] is to see the table as conventional, as dependent.

In articulating this notion in the Mūlamadhyamakakārikā, Nāgārjuna drew on an early source in the Kaccānagotta Sutta, which distinguishes definitive meaning (nītārtha) from interpretable meaning (neyārtha):

The version linked to is the one found in the nikayas, and is slightly different from the one found in the Samyuktagama. Both contain the concept of teaching via the middle between the extremes of existence and non-existence. Nagarjuna does not make reference to "everything" when he quotes the agamic text in his Mūlamadhyamakakārikā.

Causality 

Jay L. Garfield describes that Nāgārjuna approached causality from the Four Noble Truths and dependent origination. Nāgārjuna distinguished two dependent origination views in a causal process, that which causes effects and that which causes conditions. This is predicated in the two truth doctrine, as conventional truth and ultimate truth held together, in which both are empty in existence.  The distinction between effects and conditions is controversial. In Nāgārjuna's approach, cause means an event or state that has power to bring an effect. Conditions, refer to proliferating causes that bring a further event, state or process; without a metaphysical commitment to an occult connection between explaining and explanans. He argues nonexistent causes and various existing conditions. The argument draws from unreal causal power.  Things conventional exist and are ultimately nonexistent to rest in the Middle Way in both causal existence and nonexistence as casual emptiness within the Mūlamadhyamakakārikā doctrine. Although seeming strange to Westerners, this is seen as an attack on a reified view of causality.

Relativity

Nāgārjuna also taught the idea of relativity; in the Ratnāvalī, he gives the example that shortness exists only in relation to the idea of length. The determination of a thing or object is only possible in relation to other things or objects, especially by way of contrast. He held that the relationship between the ideas of "short" and "long" is not due to intrinsic nature (svabhāva). This idea is also found in the Pali Nikāyas and Chinese Āgamas, in which the idea of relativity is expressed similarly: "That which is the element of light ... is seen to exist on account of [in relation to] darkness; that which is the element of good is seen to exist on account of bad; that which is the element of space is seen to exist on account of form."

Comparative philosophy

Hinduism 
Nāgārjuna was fully acquainted with the classical Hindu philosophies of Samkhya and even the Vaiseshika. Nāgārjuna assumes a knowledge of the definitions of the sixteen categories as given in the Nyaya Sutras, the chief text of the Hindu Nyaya school, and wrote a treatise on the pramanas where he reduced the syllogism of five members into one of three. In the Vigrahavyavartani Karika, Nāgārjuna criticises the Nyaya theory of pramanas (means of knowledge)

Mahāyāna 
Nāgārjuna was conversant with many of the Śrāvaka philosophies and with the Mahāyāna tradition; however, determining Nāgārjuna's affiliation with a specific nikāya is difficult, considering much of this material has been lost. If the most commonly accepted attribution of texts (that of Christian Lindtner) holds, then he was clearly a Māhayānist, but his philosophy holds assiduously to the Śrāvaka Tripiṭaka, and while he does make explicit references to Mahāyāna texts, he is always careful to stay within the parameters set out by the Śrāvaka canon.

Nāgārjuna may have arrived at his positions from a desire to achieve a consistent exegesis of the Buddha's doctrine as recorded in the āgamas. In the eyes of Nāgārjuna, the Buddha was not merely a forerunner, but the very founder of the Madhyamaka system. David Kalupahana sees Nāgārjuna as a successor to Moggaliputta-Tissa in being a champion of the middle-way and a reviver of the original philosophical ideals of the Buddha.

Pyrrhonism 

Because of the high degree of similarity between Nāgārjuna's philosophy and Pyrrhonism, particularly the surviving works of Sextus Empiricus, Thomas McEvilley speculates that Nāgārjuna was influenced by Greek Pyrrhonist texts imported into India. Pyrrho of Elis (c. 360-c. 270 BCE), the founder of this school of sceptical philosophy, was himself influenced by Indian philosophy. Pyrrho traveled to India with Alexander the Great's army and studied with the gymnosophists. According to Christopher I. Beckwith, Pyrrho's teachings are based on Buddhism, because the Greek terms adiaphora, astathmēta and anepikrita in the Aristocles Passage resemble the Buddhist three marks of existence. According to him, the key innovative tenets of Pyrrho's scepticism were only found in Indian philosophy at the time and not in Greece.

See also 

 Acharya Nagarjuna University
 Aryadeva
 Buddhapālita
 Buddhism
 Kamalasila
 Middle Way
 Śāntarakṣita
 Sun Simiao
 Śūnyatā
 Yogachara-Madhyamaka

References

Citations

Sources 

 
 Garfield, Jay L. (1995), The Fundamental Wisdom of the Middle Way. Oxford: Oxford University Press.
 Garfield, Jay L. and Graham Priest (2003), “Nāgārjuna and the Limits of Thought”, Philosophy East and West 53 (January 2003): 1-21.
 Jones, Richard H. (2014), Nagarjuna: Buddhism's Most Important Philosopher, 2nd ed. New York: Jackson Square Books.
 
 
 
 
 Lamotte, E., Le Traite de la Grande Vertu de Sagesse, Vol I (1944), Vol II (1949), Vol III (1970), Vol IV (1976), Institut Orientaliste: Louvain-la-Neuve.
 Lindtner, Christian (1982). Nagarjuniana: Studies in the Writings and Philosophy of Nāgārjuna Akademisk forlag.
 Mabbett, Ian, (1998), “The problem of the historical Nagarjuna revisited”, Journal of the American Oriental Society, 118(3): 332–46.
 Murti, T. R. V. (1955), The Central Philosophy of Buddhism. George Allen and Unwin, London. 2nd edition: 1960.
 Murty, K. Satchidananda (1971), Nagarjuna. National Book Trust, New Delhi. 2nd edition: 1978.
 Ramanan, K. Venkata (1966), Nāgārjuna's Philosophy. Charles E. Tuttle, Vermont and Tokyo. Reprint: Motilal Banarsidass, Delhi. 1978.
 Ruegg, D. Seyfort (1981), The literature of the Madhyamaka school of philosophy in India (A History of Indian literature), Harrassowitz, .
 Sastri, H. Chatterjee, ed. (1977), The Philosophy of Nāgārjuna as contained in the Ratnāvalī. Part I [ Containing the text and introduction only ]. Saraswat Library, Calcutta.
 Streng, Frederick J. (1967), Emptiness: A Study in Religious Meaning. Nashville: Abingdon Press.
 Tuck, Andrew P. (1990), Comparative Philosophy and the Philosophy of Scholarship: on the Western Interpretation of Nāgārjuna, Oxford: Oxford University Press.
 Walser, Joseph (2002), Nagarjuna And The Ratnavali: New Ways To Date An Old Philosopher, Journal of the International Association of Buddhist Studies 25 (1-2), 209-262
 Walser, Joseph (2005), Nāgārjuna in Context: Mahāyāna Buddhism and Early Indian Culture. New York: Columbia University Press.
 Westerhoff, Jan (2010), The Dispeller of Disputes: Nāgārjuna's Vigrahavyāvartanī. Oxford: Oxford University Press.
 Westerhoff, Jan (2009), Nāgārjuna's Madhyamaka. A Philosophical Introduction. Oxford: Oxford University Press.
 Wedemeyer, Christian K. (2007), Āryadeva's Lamp that Integrates the Practices: The Gradual Path of Vajrayāna Buddhism according to the Esoteric Community Noble Tradition. New York: AIBS/Columbia University Press.

External links 

 
 
 
 Nāgārjuna – Sanskrit Buddhist texts: Acintyastava, Bodhicittavivaraṇa, Ratnāvalī, Mūlamadhyamakakārikās &c.
 Overview of traditional biographical accounts
 Online version of the Ratnāvalī (Precious Garland) in English Translated by Prof. Vidyakaraprabha and Bel-dzek
 Online version of the Suhṛllekha (Letter to a Friend) in English Translated by Alexander Berzin
 
 
 Nārāgjuna vis-à-vis the Āgama-s and Nikāya-s Byoma Kusuma Nepalese Dharmasangha (archived)
 ZenEssays: Nagarjuna and the Madhyamika
 Mula madhyamaka karika online Tibetan and English version translated by Stephen Batchelor (archived)

150 births
250 deaths
Mahayana Buddhism writers
2nd-century Buddhist monks
3rd-century Buddhist monks
3rd-century Indian philosophers
Indian scholars of Buddhism
People from Guntur district
Mahayana Buddhists
3rd-century Indian writers

Mahasiddhas
Ontologists
Telugu people
Tibetan Buddhist spiritual teachers
Buddhist yogis
Converts to Buddhism from Hinduism
Bodhisattvas
Rangtong
Monks of Nalanda
Writers from Andhra Pradesh
2nd-century Indian philosophers
Scholars from Andhra Pradesh
2nd-century Indian writers
Indian male writers
Indian Buddhist monks
Founders of Buddhist sects
Sanron-shū
Jōdo Shin patriarchs